Greg Dobbs was an ABC News television correspondent.
Over two-and-a-half decades, appearing on World News, Nightline, 20/20, and Good Morning America, Dobbs won two national Emmys and was nominated for more. He also won the Distinguished Service Award from the Society of Professional Journalists.

Then, beginning in 2004, Dobbs was a correspondent for HDNet television's documentary-style World Report. He reported in the United States on everything from PTSD to sexual offender laws to advances with stem cell treatments to abuse of the Indian Trust, and overseas on topics as varied as the legacy of Agent Orange in Vietnam, the stalemate U.S.-funded drug war in Colombia, and the aftermath of Apartheid in South Africa. Between ABC and HDNet, Dobbs has reported from more than 80 countries around the world.

He also provided live reports, along with Dan Rather, on primary and general election nights in 2008, and covered the U.S. space program for HDNet, anchoring live from Florida for every space shuttle launch after the Columbia disaster.

In-between ABC News and HDNet, Dobbs was a talk show host on the 50,000-watt KOA Radio in Denver, and a columnist for The Denver Post and the late Rocky Mountain News, and a syndicated columnist for Scripps Howard News Service. Also, for six years Dobbs hosted the television program Colorado State of Mind on Rocky Mountain PBS, for which he won another Emmy. He has been inducted into the Denver Press Club Hall of Fame. He also is co-founder of the leading baby boomer site on the internet, BoomerCafé.com.

Currently he writes columns for the online commentary platform Substack, at gregdobbs.substack.com.

Author
Besides his book Life in the Wrong Lane, which is about the wacky things journalists have to do just to get to the point of reporting a story, Dobbs also is the author of a university-level journalism textbook called Better Broadcast Writing, Better Broadcast News.

Personal life
Dobbs and his wife Carol live in Colorado and have two sons. He is active on community non-profit boards. He is a native of San Francisco with degrees from the University of California at Berkeley and Northwestern University. His father was San Francisco politician Harold Dobbs.

References

External links
 Life in the Wrong Lane, The webpage of Greg Dobbs book.

American television journalists
Living people
Writers from San Francisco
American male journalists
Year of birth missing (living people)